Sebastian Knapp is a British actor. He was born in 1980 in London. He has been an actor since age 6, and is best known for playing the role of Saint John in Son of God. He also played Melech in the 2008 cult Hammer film Beyond the Rave.

Filmography

Films

Television

References

External links

Living people
British male film actors
British male television actors
1980 births